Khirbet Jurish (Heb. The site is protected by the Israel Nature and Parks Authority. The ruins of the site stand on a hill to the west of Tzur Hadassa, on a mountain now called Har Kitron, along regional highway 375.

Description
The ruin lay adjacent to the old Jerusalem-Beit Gubrin Roman road, and was visited by PEF explorers, Conder and Kitchener. Three or four ritual immersion baths (miqva'ot) have been discovered on the site, attesting to it being an ancient Jewish settlement. The site also contains a large bottle-shaped cistern, with a depth of about 6 meters, and a bottom measuring 4.3 x 4.7 meters. Potsherds found on the site have been dated back to the Hellenistic, early Roman, and Byzantine periods. On the western slope of the ruin are five rock-carved sepulchres, attesting to the site's antiquity.

See also
 Gerasa (Judaea)

Gallery

References

Bibliography

External links
Survey of Western Palestine, Map 17:    IAA, Wikimedia commons

Ancient villages in Israel
Former populated places in Israel
Ancient Jewish history
Judea (Roman province)
Historic Jewish communities
60s disestablishments in the Roman Empire
Tells (archaeology)